From June to August 2022, persistent heatwaves affected parts of Europe, causing evacuations and over 20,000 heat-related deaths, making these heat waves the deadliest meteorological events in 2022.

A second more severe heatwave occurred in mid-July, extending north to the United Kingdom where temperatures surpassing  were recorded for the first time. The heatwaves were part of climate change in Europe.

A prolonged hot period also hit the United Kingdom.

Although temperatures in most places in Europe subsided in August, a smaller heatwave impacted France on 12 September, with temperatures reaching .

As a result of the heatwaves, widespread droughts occurred across the continent.

Eurostat reported that the European Union saw 53,000 excess deaths in July, some of which may have occurred because of the heat wave. The excess death rate was several times higher than in July 2020 or July 2021, when the COVID-19 pandemic was raging in Europe. The worst increases were seen in Spain and Cyprus.

Meteorology
The June heatwave was the result of an interaction among the high pressures that generate atmospheric stability; Tropical Storm Alex, the strong sunshine of the boreal summer and an air mass emanating from North Africa that had entered the Iberian Peninsula loaded with suspended dust that caused haze in the centre and south of the peninsula.

Climatologists linked the extreme heat to the impact of climate change, and experts predict that changes in the jet stream as a result of climate change will cause heatwaves with increasing frequency in Europe. Furthermore, due to the jet stream, the increase in heatwaves for European countries is three-to-four times higher than other countries in northern mid-latitudes, such as the United States.

By country

Andorra 
On 15 June, Andorra's weather agency, the National Meteorological Service of Andorra, issued a "significant danger weather warning" due to heat. The weather warning was expected to last until 27 July with 24 and 25 July being the days in which the agency expected to raise the warning to "extreme danger weather warning".

Austria 

Belgium 

On 19 July, the temperature reached  in Uccle, with the highest temperature that day being  in Kapelle-op-den-Bos.

Croatia 
The heat dome which caused extreme temperatures in north-west Europe was expected to affect Croatia from 21 to 24 July. Temperatures peaked on 23 July, reaching  in cities including Zagreb, Osijek, Karlovac, Slavonski Brod, Knin. Temperatures exceeding  were also recorded, but only at unofficial weather stations. The heat was ended the same day by a cold front in continental Croatia, but higher temperatures continued in the southern part of the country, which had been suffering a drought since 2021.

Denmark 

On 20 July, it reached  in Abed, Stokkemarke Parish, Lolland Municipality, breaking the all-time temperature record for that month. Copenhagen measured its record highest temperature when it reached , breaking the previous 2006 record. In Vordingborg it reached , and stayed above  for 4 hours, another Danish record.

France

June heatwave

On 16 June, Météo-France activated its red alert in 12 departments and its orange alert in another 25 because of the heatwave. The departments on red alert were mainly those located in the south-west, along the Atlantic coast and the south; the heat was generally less severe further north and east. The heatwave was the earliest in the year since records began and marked the fourth time that a red heat alert had been issued since the protocol was activated after the 2003 heatwave.

On 17 June, the red alert was activated in 14 more departments, adding the Hautes-Pyrénées and the Pyrénées-Atlantiques to the 12 of the previous day. The orange alert was activated in 56 more departments.

July heatwave

On 20 July, a baby died in an overheated car in the Pyrénées-Atlantiques. Authorities reported the deaths of two others in work-related accidents, which was raised to four on 28 July, all likely attributed to the extreme heat.

Temperatures exceeded  even in Brittany, which is unprecedented.

This July heatwave aggravated the drought that had been ongoing in the country since the start of the year, making July 2022 the driest July since records began.

September heatwave

According to Meteociel, monthly temperature records were broken at more than 70 Météo France stations.

Deaths
On 6 September, Le Monde unveiled a report by INSEE, estimating the number of deaths due to the summer (between 1 June and 22 August) heat waves at 11,000 people in France.

Germany

June heatwave 

From 14 to 20 June, Germany saw 1,636 probable heat-related deaths attributed to temperatures reaching .

July heatwave 
From 11 to 17 July, Germany saw an all-deaths excess death rate of 16% followed by 23% in the week from 18 to 24 July. This corresponds to 6,502 excess deaths. On 20 July, temperatures in several states reached new records.

Deaths 
The Robert Koch Institute put the death toll of the heatwaves at over 4,500.

Greece 

From mid–June to mid–August, Greece experienced one of its biggest heatwaves.

Guernsey and Jersey 

Hungary

July heatwave 

August heatwave 
On 2 August, Lake Velence reached record low water levels of  due to severe drought.

On 3 August, the National Meteorological Service issued a third-level heat warning, with temperatures forecast to reach the low 30s and possibly exceeding  from 4 to 6 August.

On 9 August, the National Directorate General for Water issued a press release, which stated that in the first 7 months of 2022, the amount of rainfall was 45 percent below average, making it the driest year since 1901.

On 16 August, the National Meteorological Service issued a third-level heat warning, with temperatures forecast to reach above  from 17 to 19 August. Due to the heat warning, the Hungarian State Railways and Volánbusz were distributing mineral water at major railway stations, rural railway stations and bus stations.

Ireland

July heatwave
Met Éireann issued a high-temperature advisory on 13 July, with temperatures forecast to reach the high 20s and possibly exceeding  from 17 to 19 July. Met Éireann subsequently issued a Status Yellow high-temperature warning for Ireland on 15 July, with "exceptionally" high temperatures possibly reaching .

The record highest temperature had been  at Kilkenny Castle in June 1887, but some in recent years have called for the reassessment of the previous record.

Four people died in Ireland in water-related incidents in County Dublin, Laois, Kerry and Clare.

August heatwave
Met Éireann issued a high-temperature advisory on 7 August, with temperatures forecast to reach above  for a period of five days or more from 10 to 14 August. Met Éireann subsequently issued a Status Yellow high-temperature warning for Leinster and Munster on 9 August, warning of "very warm or hot" from 11 to 13 August, with "maximum temperatures of ". Met Éireann extended its high-temperature warning nationwide from 12 August with highs of  forecast.

Met Éireann issued a nationwide Status Orange thunderstorm warning on 14 August, with heavy downpours of rain and hail forecast.

On 15 August the forecasted thunderstorms caused flooding, mainly in County Roscommon and County Carlow.

During the heatwave in Ireland, two people died in water-related incidents in County Carlow and Clare. Four tourists were rescued by the coast guard in Howth after getting trapped on a sand bank off the Dublin coast, while an eight-year-old boy was rescued after he was swept out to sea at Doughmore Beach in West Clare.

Irish Water appealed to people to conserve water as much as possible and warned that 37 water supplies around the country were being impacted by drought conditions.

Italy

June to August heatwave 
In Italy, the number of wildfires was three times the historical average by the end of June. Temperatures in Rome reached  on 28 June. On 22 July, sixteen cities including Rome were put on the red state of alert, the country's highest heatwave alert to warn of serious health risks. A glacier collapse on the mountain of Marmolada on 4 July killed eleven, and was attributed to the abnormally warm temperatures. On 5 July, a state of emergency was declared in five northern regions in response to a severe drought in the Po valley, the worst in 70 years, and later for Tuscany.

On the evening of 18 July, a large fire began in Massarosa, Lucca, which has destroyed  , reaching the province of Pisa.

On 19 July in Trieste, there was a blackout caused by a fire in Carso.

October heatwave 
From 3 October a new heat wave (first high pressure from the Azores, and then an African anticyclone) hits Italy, bringing drought back to northern Italy despite another 4 previous months of absent rains. 30 °C is exceeded in many locations.

Luxembourg 

On 18 June, the temperature reached  in Luxembourg City.

On 19 July, it reached  in Luxembourg City.

Malta 

July was also warmer than usual, and on 5 July the temperature reached .

Netherlands 
On 19 July the temperature in Maastricht reached .

Extreme heat is rare in the Netherlands; there have been only nine days with temperatures above  since the start of measurement at the central weather station in 1901. In 2019, the Netherlands experienced temperatures surpassing  for the first time in recorded history, with  recorded in Gilze-Rijen.

According to satellite measurements, the southernmost Belgium–Netherlands border may have reached , which could be the highest provisional temperature recorded in the country.

Norway

June heatwave

On 28 June, Tromsø reached  and Saltdal reached , both records for June. Mehamn reached , higher than its previous record for June by almost 10 degrees.

July heatwave

In Stavanger, temperatures are forecasted to reach . In Nordland, 20 and 21 July were forecasted to be the hottest days, with temperatures above . In Øst-Finnmark and Finnmarksvidda, temperatures on 21 and 22 July were predicted to reach . However, the Meteorological Institute does not believe that any national records will be broken.
On 22 July, Oslo measured its highest temperature since 2009, when the temperature reached 34.0°C.

Poland
On 19 June, temperatures in western Poland exceeded . Once again, temperatures peaked at the end of the month. On 30 June, nine meteorological stations recorded record-breaking monthly temperatures. New monthly records were also set on 1 July. In Tarnów, the temperature reached , breaking the record for July. Krosno recorded , the highest temperature in that station's history.

On 22 June, a one-year-old boy mistakenly left in a car died in Szczecin. On 24 June, a man died in the queue of cars at the Polish-Ukrainian border by suspected overheating. On 26 June in Płońsk, a man died from suspected sunstroke.

Portugal

According to Instituto Português do Mar e da Atmosfera (IPMA), the heatwave was the longest and had the greatest area extension of any July heatwave in Portugal since 1941.

In Algarve, a fire began in the city of Faro that spread to the Quinta do Lago resort. According to the Civil Protection Authority, at least 135 people were injured since the wildfires began. A pilot died when his waterbombing plane crashed in Vila Nova de Foz Côa while combating wildfires in the region.

At least 238 people died because of the heat, with 187 injuries. According to the Portuguese Health Ministry, the heatwave killed 1,063 people between 7 and 18 July. A further three people – two firefighters and a civilian – were killed in wildfires.

San Marino 
In late July, San Marino experienced a heatwave. On 24 July the temperature reached  in Dogana.

Serbia 
On 23 July the temperature reached  in Niš, only 4.9°C under the record from 2007.

Slovakia

Romania 
On 24 July the temperature reached  in Bucharest and Craiova.

Slovenia

Summer heat waves

On 4 July, the ARSO reported that temperatures reached  in Bilje.

In mid-July, the ARSO reported the status of droughts as significant or severe for most of western and central Slovenia. By the end of the month, agriculture was affected by droughts in the entire country, although they were especially severe in its south-west.

Along with periods of wind, long-lasting and severe droughts were mentioned as one of the key factors that facilitated the spread of the wildfires that broke out in the Karst Plateau around the southern part of the Italy–Slovenia border on 17 July and became the most extensive spread of wildfires ever recorded in Slovenia three days later, when it was reported that an estimated  of land were burnt. By 25 July, the spread of the wildfires in the Karst Plateau was largely stopped, but minor fires were still appearing in the affected areas.

Autumn heat waves
The night between 14 and 15 September was unusually hot in many parts of Slovenia. The ARSO reported that temperatures did not fall below  at several stations in their network, with the one at Portorož Airport not recording temperatures lower than  during the night.

Spain

June heatwave

A special heat warning was activated by the AEMET on 10 June, but only for 12 provinces and with yellow alerts in Aragon, Castilla-La Mancha, Catalonia, Extremadura and Madrid, with an orange alert for Andalusia. In this first stage, the unusual heat did not affect the Canary Islands, Galicia, the western Cantabrian coast and points of the peninsular Mediterranean coast. Initially, the AEMET predicted that the heatwave would last until 15 June, although it speculated that the heat might continue for the rest of the week.

The alerts also remained activated for Aragon, Castile and León, Castilla-La Mancha, Catalonia and Madrid at a yellow level, and at an orange level for Extremadura and Andalusia. However, the weather conditions did not meet the official criteria to start the heatwave.

On 12 June, temperatures reached  in Almadén (Ciudad Real), the highest value on the official start day of the heatwave. Temperatures above  were also recorded at 47 stations in the AEMET network. The agency issued special notice number 3/2022 with information about the phenomenon and initiated a national plan of preventive actions with a level-assignment map.

On 14 June, the heatwave spread to the south of Galicia and the interior of the Cantabrian Sea. It was predicted that the peak of the heatwave would be reached on Friday, 17 June, with the possibility of record-breaking temperatures in Zaragoza, Lleida and Córdoba.

The only points in Spain that were not affected are Asturias, the Canary Islands and the autonomous cities of Ceuta and Melilla. In its daily statement, AEMET predicted the end of the weather episode for 18 June, with hot African air causing instability and a drop in temperatures.

Rubén del Campo of AEMET stated that it was the "most intense heatwave for mid-June of, at least, the last 20 years."

The first day of application of the "Iberian exception", by which the regulated price of electricity is calculated with a cap on gas for its generation, was 15 June. The PVPC is the voluntary price for the small consumer, for which more will be paid for electricity for compensation to thermal power plants and the greater use of gas and coal in the midst of a heatwave.

The last day of the Spanish heatwave was 18 June, an event termed "intense, extensive and extraordinary" according to AEMET, which determined that the springtime heatwave was among the earliest in the year since Spain began keeping records.

Estimates from the Carlos III Health Institute placed the total June death toll at 830.

July heatwave

On 14 July, the Carlos III Health Institute announced that at least 43 people had died on 10 and 11 July from the heat. On 16 July, at least 360 people died between 10 July and 15 July from the heat.

On 18 July, the Carlos III Health Institute reported an additional 150 heat-related deaths on 16 July, bringing the total death toll to 510, which was raised to 679 the next day. Final estimates from the Carlos III Health Institute placed the total July death toll at 2,063. However, in a report published later in the year, the July death toll was placed at 2,223.

On 24 July, the Seville city council gave the ongoing heat wave the name Zoe, thereby making it the first named heat wave in the world.

The drought at the Valdecañas reservoir revealed the Dolmen of Guadalperal, a prehistoric stone circle.

August heatwave

In a report published later in the year, the August death toll was placed at 1,602.

Sweden

During the summer of 2022, Sweden experienced three heatwaves in late June, July, and mid August.

The highest temperature was measured on 21 July when the temperature reached  in Linköping.

Switzerland
On 15 June, a heat-wave alert was activated in the canton of Ticino. The following day, the cantons of Geneva and Vaud issued alerts.

On the 16 June, the Federal Office for Meteorology and Climatology (MeteoSwiss) reported that temperatures of  had been measured in the southern Alps, central Valais and the Lake Geneva region, but had only exceeded the threshold to be considered a heatwave (average temperature of  throughout the day) at the local level.

On 17 June, MeteoSwiss activated orange and yellow alerts for heatwaves in most of the country.

United Kingdom

June heatwave
On 14 June, in view of the Met Office's forecast of high temperatures, the UK Health Security Agency (UKHSA) issued level 2 "alert and readiness" alerts in several regions for the period between midnight on 16 June and midnight on 18 June. The affected regions were London, the East Midlands, the East, South East and South West England.

On 15 June, the UKHSA issued level 3 "heat-wave action" alerts for London, East and South East England, maintaining level 2 alerts for the East Midlands and South West England. According to Met Office forecasts, the heat peak would arrive on Friday, reaching the necessary threshold for heatwave consideration, before temperatures dropped significantly on 18 June. On 17 June, London reached  on the hottest day of the June heatwave.

July heatwave

On 8 July, the Met Office issued a heat-health alert in parts of England and Wales. On 15 July, the UKHSA increased the Heatwave Alert Level to 4, "illness and death occurring among the fit and healthy—and not just in high-risk groups".

On 18 July, the first day of the red warning, temperatures reached  in Santon Downham, Suffolk. Wales potentially broke its record for the highest recorded temperature, with  provisionally recorded in Hawarden.

Scotland may also have a new record high if the  provisionally recorded at Floors Castle is confirmed.

At least ten people died in water-related incidents and the London Fire Brigade declared a major incident after several fires broke out across the capital as a result of the heatwave. 19 July was the brigade's busiest day since World War II.

In total, there were about 3,200 heat-related deaths in the UK, 2,800 of whom were above the age of 65.

August heatwave

In August, Tom Morgan, a Met Office meteorologist, said that "temperatures will not go as high as they did during July" but will last over "a prolonged period" with "temperatures in the low-30s". On 8 August the UK Health Security Agency issued a level 3 heat health alert for central and southern England effective from 9 to 13 August, which was later extended to 14 August.

On 9 August, the Met Office issued an amber weather warning for extreme heat, which is in place for most of England and Wales from 11 to 14 August.

Thunderstorms began following the end of the heatwave on 15 August.

Vatican 
The Vatican was also affected by the heatwave as did Italy. On 24 July the temperature reached .

Highest temperature by country 
These are the highest temperatures recorded in each country affected by the heatwave.

See also

 Heat waves of 2022
 2022 European and Mediterranean wildfires
 2022 European drought
 Climate change in Europe
 2003 European heat wave, which caused over 70,000 excess deaths
 2006 European heat wave
 2018 European heat wave
 2019 European heat waves
 2022 Siberian wildfires
 2021 Western North America heat wave
 List of weather records

References

European
2022 disasters in Europe
2022 meteorology
2022
June 2022 events in Europe
July 2022 events in Europe
August 2022 events in Europe
2022 in Andorra
2022 in Croatia
2022 in France
2022 in Germany
2022 in Greece
2022 in Hungary
2022 in Ireland
2022 in Italy
2022 in Montenegro
2022 in the Netherlands
2022 in Norway
2022 in Poland
2022 in Portugal
2022 in Romania
2022 in Slovakia
2022 in Slovenia
2022 in Spain
2022 in Switzerland
2022 in the United Kingdom
Climate change in Europe